The Purple Album is the twelfth studio album by British hard rock band Whitesnake. It contains remakes of songs from Deep Purple band lineups Mark III and Mark IV, when Whitesnake lead singer David Coverdale was a member of that band. It was released on 29 April in Japan, 15 May in Europe, 18 May in the UK and 19 May 2015 in the US through Frontiers Records.

Overview
The album debuted at number 87 on the Billboard 200 with first week sales of around 6,900 units in its first week of release. It is also the first album since the band's 1989 studio album, Slip of the Tongue, to feature drummer Tommy Aldridge.

Track listing

Personnel

Whitesnake
 David Coverdale – lead vocals, producer, mixing
 Reb Beach – guitars, backing vocals, producer, mixing
 Joel Hoekstra – guitars, backing vocals
 Michael Devin – bass, harmonica, backing vocals
 Tommy Aldridge – drums

Additional musicians
 Derek Hilland - keyboards

Production
 Michael McIntyre - producer, engineer, mixing
 David Donnelly - mastering

Charts

References

2015 albums
Whitesnake albums
Deep Purple tribute albums
Frontiers Records albums